The Longwood Symphony Orchestra is a volunteer non-profit orchestra based in Boston, Massachusetts, composed of medical professionals. Their concerts act as fundraisers for health-related non-profit organizations. It was founded in 1982 by members of the Harvard Medical School. They perform four concerts a year in Jordan Hall at the New England Conservatory, plus a summer outdoors concert at the Hatch Shell. The current music director and conductor is Ronald Feldman. The orchestra has been profiled in the Wall Street Journal, the Boston Globe, and the Boston Herald. In June 2007, the Longwood Symphony Orchestra accepted the 2007 MetLife Award for Excellence in Community Engagement from the American Symphony Orchestra League.

References

External links 
Official site

Culture of Boston
Musical groups from Boston
Musical groups established in 1982
Non-profit organizations based in Boston
Orchestras based in Massachusetts
1982 establishments in Massachusetts